Ergys Sorra (born 30 July 1989) is an Albanian professional footballer who plays as a striker.

Club career

Tirana
Sorra made his debut for Tirana in round 31 of the 2007–08 Albanian Superliga on 10 May 2008 in a 1–0 away loss to Besëlidhja Lezhë. He came on as a substitute for Berat Hyseni in the 68th minute of the game marking his first and only league appearance of the season. 

His first league goal came on 16 May of the following year in the 2009–10 Albanian Superliga matchday 32 against city rivals Dinamo Tirana; he came again as substitute for Entonio Pashaj and netted in 73rd minute to put Tirana 3–1 up and sealed the victory despite Dinamo's Elis Bakaj scoring late on in the game.

Sorra wore the number 11 jersey for the 2009–10 season, changing from his previous number 18 jersey.

Luftëtari Gjirokastër
On 18 July 2012, Sorra joined top flight side Luftëtari Gjirokastër by penning a one-year contract. During his short spell at the club, Sorra made only two cup appearances, starting in both first round legs against Gramshi.

Dinamo Tirana
In January 2013, Sorra completed a transfer at Dinamo Tirana.

Tirana return
In July 2013, Sorra returned to Tirana.

Sorra was sent on loan at fellow capital side Dinamo Tirana for the 2014–15 season. During the course of season, Sorra made 9 league appearances and two cup appearances.

Sorra was registered as Tirana player for the 2015–16 season. He didn't make any league appearance during that season and wasn't even on the bench. He did however played one cup match on 4 November 2015 against Kastrioti Krujë in the second leg of second round.

International career
Sorra burst on to the international scene in 2005, where he was called up to the under-17 squad. Later in April 2007, he was part of the under-19 side coached by Ramadan Shehu that participated in Slovakia Cup 2007. He played in all three matches against Slovakia, Croatia and Poland with Albania losing all and failing to score a single goal.

Career statistics

References

External links

Profile - FSHF

1989 births
Living people
Footballers from Tirana
Albanian footballers
Albania youth international footballers
Association football forwards
KF Tirana players
FK Dinamo Tirana players
Luftëtari Gjirokastër players
Kategoria Superiore players
Kategoria e Parë players